Leonhard Viljus (28 March 1904 – 17 January 1970) was an Estonian sport shooter.

He was born in Kokora Rural Municipality. In 1927 he graduated from a military school.

He won 4 medals at ISSF World Shooting Championships. He was 5-times Estonian champion in different shooting disciplines. 1933–1939 he was a member of Estonian national sport shooting team.

During WW II he fought in Wehrmacht. In 1942 he got severely injured at Stalingrad. 1944 he returned to Estonia. Later he worked at Nõmmküla sovkhoz.

References

1904 births
1970 deaths
Estonian male sport shooters
People from Peipsiääre Parish
20th-century Estonian people